Sir Ambrose Cave (died 2 April 1568) was an English politician and Chancellor of the Duchy of Lancaster.

Life
Ambrose Cave was the son of Richard Cave (see Cave-Browne-Cave baronets) and Margaret Saxby of Stanford, Northamptonshire. He was educated at Cambridge University. He was knighted by 1525. He was a Member of Parliament for Leicestershire in 1545, 1547 and 1553 and for Warwickshire in 1558, 1559 and 1563 and High Sheriff of Warwickshire in 1549. He was also Chancellor of the Duchy of Lancaster (1558–1569) and Custos Rotulorum of Warwickshire (also 1558–1568).

Cave married Margery Willington, daughter of William Willington. Their daughter Margaret married Sir Henry Knollys, privateer and MP. His nephew Roger Cave married Margaret, a sister of William Cecil, 1st Baron Burghley.

References

Year of birth missing
1568 deaths
Members of the Parliament of England for Leicestershire
High Sheriffs of Warwickshire
English MPs 1545–1547
English MPs 1547–1552
English MPs 1553 (Edward VI)
English MPs 1558
English MPs 1559
English MPs 1563–1567
Chancellors of the Duchy of Lancaster
Knights Bachelor
English knights